Nada is a feminine given name found with the etymology of 'hope' in South Slavic-speaking countries of Bosnia and Herzegovina, Croatia, Slovenia and Serbia, and the etymology of 'dew' in Arabic-speaking countries.

In Croatia, the name Nada was the second most common feminine given name between 1950 and 1959.

Notable people with the name include:

 Nada Abbas (born 2000), Egyptian squash player
 Nada Birko (1931–2020), Yugoslav cross-country skier
 Nada Boustani Khoury (born 1983), Lebanese politician
 Nada Cristofoli (born 1971), Italian cyclist
 Nada Ćurčija Prodanović (1923–1992), Serbian translator, children's author and piano teacher
 Nada Dimić (1923–1942), Yugoslav war hero
 Nada Gačešić-Livaković (born 1951), Croatian actress
 Nada Golmie, American computer scientist and engineer
 Nada Hafez (born 1997), Egyptian sabre fencer
 Nada Kawar (born 1975), Jordanian athlete
 Nada Klaić (1920–1988), Croatian historian
 Nada Kotlušek (born 1934), Slovenian athlete
 Nada Malanima (born 1953), Italian singer
 Nada Mamula (1927–2001), Bosnian singer
 Nada Matić (born 1984), Serbian table tennis player
 Nada Mezni Hafaiedh (born 1984), Tunisian film director
 Nada Nadim Prouty (born c. 1970), Lebanese intelligence professional of Druze descent
 Nada Naumović (1922–1941), Serbian student activist
 Nada Obrić (born 1948), Bosnian Serb singer
 Nada Rocco (born 1947), Croatian actress
 Nada Shabout (born 1962), American art historian and author of Palestinian and Iraqi descent
 Nada Spasić (born 1934), Yugoslav gymnast
 Nada Šargin (born 1977), Serbian actress
 Nada Tončić (1909–1998), Croatian opera singer
 Nada Zeidan (born 1976), Palestinian athlete

See also
 Hope (given name)
 Nadia
 Nadja (given name)
 Nađa

References

Croatian feminine given names
Serbian feminine given names
Slovene feminine given names
Arabic feminine given names